The 2nd constituency of Charente is a French legislative constituency in the Charente département.

Deputies

Election results

2022

 
 
 
 
 
 
 
 
|-
| colspan="8" bgcolor="#E9E9E9"|
|-

2017

2012

|- style="background-color:#E9E9E9;text-align:center;"
! colspan="2" rowspan="2" style="text-align:left;" | Candidate
! rowspan="2" colspan="2" style="text-align:left;" | Party
! colspan="2" | 1st round
! colspan="2" | 2nd round
|- style="background-color:#E9E9E9;text-align:center;"
! width="75" | Votes
! width="30" | %
! width="75" | Votes
! width="30" | %
|-
| style="background-color:" |
| style="text-align:left;" | Marie-Line Reynaud
| style="text-align:left;" | Socialist Party
| PS
| 
| 42.58%
| 
| 57.08%
|-
| style="background-color:" |
| style="text-align:left;" | Daniel Sauvaitre
| style="text-align:left;" | Union for a Popular Movement
| UMP
| 
| 27.32%
| 
| 42.92%
|-
| style="background-color:" |
| style="text-align:left;" | Christophe Gillet
| style="text-align:left;" | Front National
| FN
| 
| 11.26%
| colspan="2" style="text-align:left;" |
|-
| style="background-color:" |
| style="text-align:left;" | Jérôme Sourisseau
| style="text-align:left;" | 
| CEN
| 
| 6.94%
| colspan="2" style="text-align:left;" |
|-
| style="background-color:" |
| style="text-align:left;" | Sylvie Mamet
| style="text-align:left;" | Left Front
| FG
| 
| 4.90%
| colspan="2" style="text-align:left;" |
|-
| style="background-color:" |
| style="text-align:left;" | Françoise Garandeau
| style="text-align:left;" | Europe Ecology – The Greens
| EELV
| 
| 3.07%
| colspan="2" style="text-align:left;" |
|-
| style="background-color:" |
| style="text-align:left;" | Brigitte Miet
| style="text-align:left;" | Miscellaneous Right
| DVD
| 
| 1.52%
| colspan="2" style="text-align:left;" |
|-
| style="background-color:" |
| style="text-align:left;" | Martine L'Huillier
| style="text-align:left;" | Miscellaneous Right
| DVD
| 
| 0.64%
| colspan="2" style="text-align:left;" |
|-
| style="background-color:" |
| style="text-align:left;" | Elisabeth Tomasini
| style="text-align:left;" | Miscellaneous Right
| DVD
| 
| 0.59%
| colspan="2" style="text-align:left;" |
|-
| style="background-color:" |
| style="text-align:left;" | Marion Maltor
| style="text-align:left;" | Other
| AUT
| 
| 0.53%
| colspan="2" style="text-align:left;" |
|-
| style="background-color:" |
| style="text-align:left;" | Gwenaëlle Gamine
| style="text-align:left;" | Far Left
| EXG
| 
| 0.48%
| colspan="2" style="text-align:left;" |
|-
| style="background-color:" |
| style="text-align:left;" | Jocelyne Hanrio
| style="text-align:left;" | Radical Party
| PRV
| 
| 0.15%
| colspan="2" style="text-align:left;" |
|-
| colspan="8" style="background-color:#E9E9E9;"|
|- style="font-weight:bold"
| colspan="4" style="text-align:left;" | Total
| 
| 100%
| 
| 100%
|-
| colspan="8" style="background-color:#E9E9E9;"|
|-
| colspan="4" style="text-align:left;" | Registered voters
| 
| style="background-color:#E9E9E9;"|
| 
| style="background-color:#E9E9E9;"|
|-
| colspan="4" style="text-align:left;" | Blank/Void ballots
| 
| 1.84%
| 
| 3.05%
|-
| colspan="4" style="text-align:left;" | Turnout
| 
| 57.65%
| 
| 56.97%
|-
| colspan="4" style="text-align:left;" | Abstentions
| 
| 42.35%
| 
| 43.03%
|-
| colspan="8" style="background-color:#E9E9E9;"|
|- style="font-weight:bold"
| colspan="6" style="text-align:left;" | Result
| colspan="2" style="background-color:" | PS HOLD
|}

2007

|- style="background-color:#E9E9E9;text-align:center;"
! colspan="2" rowspan="2" style="text-align:left;" | Candidate
! rowspan="2" colspan="2" style="text-align:left;" | Party
! colspan="2" | 1st round
! colspan="2" | 2nd round
|- style="background-color:#E9E9E9;text-align:center;"
! width="75" | Votes
! width="30" | %
! width="75" | Votes
! width="30" | %
|-
| style="background-color:" |
| style="text-align:left;" | Marie-Line Reynaud
| style="text-align:left;" | Socialist Party
| PS
| 
| 28.37%
| 
| 52.78%
|-
| style="background-color:" |
| style="text-align:left;" | Jérôme Mouhot
| style="text-align:left;" | Union for a Popular Movement
| UMP
| 
| 26.78%
| 
| 47.22%
|-
| style="background-color:" |
| style="text-align:left;" | Bertrand Sourisseau
| style="text-align:left;" | Miscellaneous Right
| DVD
| 
| 17.84%
| colspan="2" style="text-align:left;" |
|-
| style="background-color:" |
| style="text-align:left;" | Noël Belliot
| style="text-align:left;" | Democratic Movement
| MoDem
| 
| 5.51%
| colspan="2" style="text-align:left;" |
|-
| style="background-color:" |
| style="text-align:left;" | Jean-Claude Fayemendie
| style="text-align:left;" | Miscellaneous Left
| DVG
| 
| 4.95%
| colspan="2" style="text-align:left;" |
|-
| style="background-color:" |
| style="text-align:left;" | Michel Adam
| style="text-align:left;" | The Greens
| VEC
| 
| 2.74%
| colspan="2" style="text-align:left;" |
|-
| style="background-color:" |
| style="text-align:left;" | Simone Fayaud
| style="text-align:left;" | Communist
| PCF
| 
| 2.66%
| colspan="2" style="text-align:left;" |
|-
| style="background-color:" |
| style="text-align:left;" | Jean-Baptiste Millon
| style="text-align:left;" | Front National
| FN
| 
| 2.61%
| colspan="2" style="text-align:left;" |
|-
| style="background-color:" |
| style="text-align:left;" | Philippe Malsacré
| style="text-align:left;" | Hunting, Fishing, Nature, Traditions
| CPNT
| 
| 2.40%
| colspan="2" style="text-align:left;" |
|-
| style="background-color:" |
| style="text-align:left;" | Nathlaie Nouts
| style="text-align:left;" | Far Left
| EXG
| 
| 2.13%
| colspan="2" style="text-align:left;" |
|-
| style="background-color:" |
| style="text-align:left;" | Patrick Bompoint
| style="text-align:left;" | Radical Party of the Left
| PRG
| 
| 1.70%
| colspan="2" style="text-align:left;" |
|-
| style="background-color:" |
| style="text-align:left;" | Danièlle Dessouchet
| style="text-align:left;" | Far Left
| EXG
| 
| 1.02%
| colspan="2" style="text-align:left;" |
|-
| style="background-color:" |
| style="text-align:left;" | Patrick Fito
| style="text-align:left;" | Movement for France
| MPF
| 
| 0.93%
| colspan="2" style="text-align:left;" |
|-
| style="background-color:" |
| style="text-align:left;" | Jean-Pierre Tournier
| style="text-align:left;" | Far Right
| EXD
| 
| 0.36%
| colspan="2" style="text-align:left;" |
|-
| colspan="8" style="background-color:#E9E9E9;"|
|- style="font-weight:bold"
| colspan="4" style="text-align:left;" | Total
| 
| 100%
| 
| 100%
|-
| colspan="8" style="background-color:#E9E9E9;"|
|-
| colspan="4" style="text-align:left;" | Registered voters
| 
| style="background-color:#E9E9E9;"|
| 
| style="background-color:#E9E9E9;"|
|-
| colspan="4" style="text-align:left;" | Blank/Void ballots
| 
| 1.92%
| 
| 3.08%
|-
| colspan="4" style="text-align:left;" | Turnout
| 
| 60.47%
| 
| 62.13%
|-
| colspan="4" style="text-align:left;" | Abstentions
| 
| 39.53%
| 
| 37.87%
|-
| colspan="8" style="background-color:#E9E9E9;"|
|- style="font-weight:bold"
| colspan="6" style="text-align:left;" | Result
| colspan="2" style="background-color:" | PS gain from UMP
|}

2002

 
 
 
 
 
 
 
 
|-
| colspan="8" bgcolor="#E9E9E9"|
|-

1997

References

2